Richard Deimel Vann is an American academic and diver.

Positions
Vann is a consultant was a Divers Alert Network, Assistant Professor Emeritus in Anesthesiology at Duke University Medical Center, and safety officer and director of applied research at Duke University Medical Center,

Speaker
 2008 Divers Alert Network Technical Diving Conference. – Video of "Oxygen Toxicity" lecture by Dr. Richard Vann (free download, mp4, 86MB).
 2013 DEMA Show, Orlando "Art and Science of Rebreather Diving, Project Dive Exploration: 1995-2008, Evidence-Based Decompression".

Works
 
 
 Mitchell Simon J, Bennett Michael H, Bird Nick, Doolette David J, Hobbs Gene W, Kay Edward, Moon Richard E, Neuman Tom S, Vann Richard D, Walker Richard, Wyatt HA. (2012) ". In: Undersea & Hyperbaric Medicine Journal. 2012; Volume 39, Issue 6, Pages 1099-1108
 Dr Richard D Vann PhD, Frank K Butler MD, Simon J Mitchell FANZCA, Prof Richard E Moon MD. (2011). "Decompression Illness". In: The Lancet. January 2011; Volume 377, Issue 9760, Pages 153 - 164
 

  In: 2005 Spring; 6(1):32-42.
 
 
 Natoli, MJ; Hobbs, GW; Pollock, NW; Stolp, BW; Corkey, WB; Gabrielova, I; Hendricks, DM; Schinazi, EA; Almon, AK; Pieper, CF; Vann, RD (2000). ".
 Neal W. Pollock, Richard D. Vann, Edward D. Thalmann and Claus EG Lundgren. (1997). ". In: EJ Maney, Jr and CH Ellis, Jr (Eds.) Diving for Science...1997. Proceedings of the American Academy of Underwater Sciences (17th Annual Scientific Diving Symposium).

Awards
Johnson Space Center Group Achievement Award (STS134/ULF6 In-Suit Light Exercise Team), National Aeronautics and Space Administration (NASA), September 2011
2012 Albert R Behnke Award
2014 Recipient of the Aerospace Medical Association’s John Ernsting Award
2014 Academy of Underwater Arts and Sciences NOGI Award for Science
2014 EUROTEK Media Award (Rebreather Forum 3 Conference Proceedings)
2015 DEMA Reaching Out Award for Science and Research - 'Tribute Film'

References

Year of birth missing (living people)
Living people
American underwater divers
Decompression researchers
Duke University School of Medicine faculty